Westerfield is a coastal community on Mainland, in Shetland, Scotland. The community is within the parish of Sandsting.

It lies to the west of Tresta on the main A971 road.

References

External links

Geograph images of the area around Westerfield

Villages in Mainland, Shetland